Ghazan Marri is a politician from  Balochistan, Pakistan. Marri is the son of politician Nawab Khair Bakhsh Marri.

Life
Marri's late brother, Balach Marri, was a BLA leader who was declared to be a terrorist by Pakistan.

In 2006, he was arrested in the United Arab Emirates at the request of the Pakistan authorities, in connection with the murder of judge Nawaz Marri. He was later tried in an anti-terrorist court in Pakistan.

In 2017, he returned to Pakistan, ending an 18-year exile in the UAE. Marri said he intended to face all court cases pending against him, and would join mainstream politics.

References

Baloch people
Living people
Politicians from Balochistan, Pakistan
Pakistani expatriates in the United Arab Emirates
Ghazan
Year of birth missing (living people)